Luiz "Luizão" Corrêa de Jesus (born June 7, 1973 in Manaus) is a male beach volleyball player from Brazil, who won the silver medal in the men's beach team competition at the 2003 Pan American Games in Santo Domingo, Dominican Republic, partnering Paulo Emilio Silva.

References

1973 births
Living people
Brazilian men's beach volleyball players
Beach volleyball players at the 2003 Pan American Games
Pan American Games silver medalists for Brazil
Pan American Games medalists in volleyball
Medalists at the 2003 Pan American Games
People from Manaus
Sportspeople from Amazonas (Brazilian state)
21st-century Brazilian people